The native form of this personal name is Cey-Bert Róbert. This article uses Western name order when mentioning individuals.

Róbert Gyula Cey-Bert (born July 5, 1938) is a Hungarian writer, psychosociologist, food historian and a university professor.

Early years, studies

Childhood, studies in Kaposvár 
Cey-Bert was born in Bárdudvarnok, Hungary on 5 July 1938. His ancestors were water millers in South Somogy for centuries; they included the areas of Barcs, Babócsa, Vízvár, Csurgó, Rinyaszentkirály and Lábod. His father, Géza Czeibert, was the last mill owner of the centuries-old miller dynasty, the mill was nationalised and closed down by the communist regime in 1949.

After graduating from the Central Primary School in Kaposvár, he started his secondary school studies at the Táncsics Mihály gimnázium. As a high school student, he studied literature and history far beyond what was expected in the curriculum, and played a lot of sports, especially athletics and football.

1956, Austria, Switzerland 
On the news of the outbreak of the 1956 revolution, he travelled to Budapest on 25 October 1956, where he joined the Corvin köz rebels led by Gergely Pongrátz. After the fall of the city centre, he managed to return to Kaposvár. In several classes of his secondary school he gave accounts to his teachers and fellow students of the struggles and revolutionary days he had experienced in Pest. It became common knowledge in the town that he had been an active participant in the armed struggles in Pest, his teachers warned him that the AVO was reorganising and that if he wanted to survive he would have to flee and leave the country.

On 21 November, he crossed over to Austria, where he graduated from the Hungarian-language grammar school, the Ungarisches Realgimnasium, in Kammer am Attersee.

After graduating from high school, he continued his studies at the University of Geneva, Switzerland, between 1958 and 1965, where he was elected president of the Hungarian student community of over 120 students in 1960. He graduated first in economics and then in sociology. He completed his doctoral thesis at the Sorbonne in Paris, under the supervision of Professor Jean Cazeneuve, on the Psychosociologie des cuisines nationales et des civilisations gastronomiques, and defended it at the University of Geneva.

Career

Geneva 
After obtaining his doctorate, he started a family in 1966. The same year, in Geneva, he founded his research institute Institut de recherches de Motivation et de Communication, of which he became director.

His research interests were in marketing and advertising psychology; he studied shopping, eating and travel habits.

Over time, he developed a close relationship with Cardinal-Prince József Mindszenty, who was living in exile, visiting him several times and helping him to write his book on King Saint Stephen.

Over time, a close relationship developed between him and Cardinal Primate József Mindszenty, who lived in exile at the Pázmáneum. From Geneva, he visited the Cardinal-Prince several times in Vienna and helped him to write his book on  King Saint Stephen. Cey-Bert was admitted to the Knight Cross of the Order of St Lazarita on the recommendation of Mindszenty.

Far East 
His wife died in 1981, after that, his work increasingly focused on the Far East, building business relationships in Hong Kong, Osaka, Bangkok and Singapore. In Bangkok, he founded the research institute Gastronomy Research International, where his main research focus was the study of Asian eating habits. As a result of his research, he was the first in the world to identify two great civilisations according to their gastronomic customs, rooted in the ancient past. Thanks to his research, a growing number of major airlines and luxury hotels have sought him out as an expert to improve their services and gastronomic strategies.

His international gastronomic conferences, pairing gourmet Chinese cuisine with French wines, have been so successful that he has become a well-known and sought-after figure on the international gastronomic scene, from Thailand to Indonesia and Singapore.

Some of the international symposia and congresses organised by Cey-Bert and directly or indirectly related to his period in the Far East:

 The harmonization of Chinese cuisine and French wines" - Hong Kong, Guandong, Beijing (1981)
 La Nouvelle Cuisine Francaise, gastronomic strategy - Bangkok (1981)
 Harmonization of Japanese cuisine and French wines - Osaka (1982)
 Wines and Chocolate - Paris (1983)
 Summit of the Great Powers of Gastronomy - Bangkok; Secretary General: Róbert Gyula Cey-Bert (1984)
 Summit of the Great Gastronomic Powers - Paris, Rome; Secretary General: Róbert Gyula Cey-Bert (1985)
 Harmonizing Thai Cuisine and Wine - Bangkok (1988)
 First World Gastronomic Congress - Mexico City; President: Henri Gault, Secretary General: Róbert Gyula Cey-Bert (1989)
 Second World Gastronomic Congress: foundation of the World Federation of Gastronomy - Mexico City; President: Róbert Gyula Cey-Bert (1996)

As mentioned above, Cey-Bert was elected Secretary General of the World Gastronomic Council in Bangkok in 1984 and President of the World Federation of Gastronomy in Mexico City in 1996.

In addition to his gastronomic activities, he was also involved in research on Hungarian prehistory and religious history.

He continued his research on Hungarian prehistory in China, Uyguria, Tibet and Inner Mongolia.

He studied religious history as a Shinto monk in Japan and as a Buddhist monk in Thailand. In addition to Japan and Thailand, he has conducted research on religious history among the Animist hill tribes of Laos and in Myanmar (until 1989 Burma).

Karen ambassador 
Cey-Bert, in his research into the history of religion, learned about the persecuted Karen people, who have been fighting the Myanmar (Burmese) government since 1949 to achieve Karen self-determination.

In 1992, the Karen interim government appointed Cey-Bert as its international ambassador, and after considerable diplomatic effort, he succeeded in getting the Karen admitted to the Unrepresented Nations and Peoples Organization (UNPO). Every year, Cey-Bert spends several months with the Karen, where he is still held in high esteem.

Back in Hungary 
In 1996 he returned to Hungary and founded the research institute Cey-Bert Kutató Intézetet in Budapest, where he worked as a consultant for renowned hotels and major Hungarian companies.

Between 2000 and 2012, he became a lecturer at Kodolányi János University as the head of the gastronomy group in the Department of Tourism, where he taught wine and gastronomy marketing.

From 2021 he will be Senior Advisor at the  Magyarságkutató Intézet.

He is a member of the International Wine Academy and the Hungarian Wine Academy; Honorary President of the World Federation of Gastronomy.

Since 1998, he has written books mainly on wine and gastronomy, religious history and prehistory, but has also published poetry and novels.

In addition to Hungarian, his books have been published in four languages, French, English, German and Turkish.

Family 
He married in 1965. He has two children, Tünde (1966) and Tibor (1968).

Cey-bert has five grandchildren: his daughter's daughters Csenge (1998), Szinta (2000) and Tenke (2004); as well as his son's sons Turul (2006) and Timur (2008).

He was widowed in 1981, he remarried in 2006, his wife is Szekler, Dr. Éva Németh, who works as a neurologist in the hospital in Siófok.

He lives in Siófok and in his renovated mansion in Bárdudvarnok.

Awards, honours 

 Knight's Cross of the Hungarian Order of Merit 
 Knight Cross of the Order of St Lazarita
 Gold Diploma of the International Symposium of Chinese Cuisine and French Wines (Hong Kong)
 Culinary Great Powers Summit Award (Bangkok)
 President's Award of the World Federation of Gastronomic Sciences (Mexico City)
 Honorary citizen of Bárdudvarnok
 Pro Comitatu Somogy díj
 Pesti Srác 1956 díj

Bibliography

Wine and gastronomy 

 New pattern of food preferencies. IRCM, Genève 1972
 Nouvelle orientation alimentaire. IRCM, 1972
 Airlines gastronomic promotion. IRCM, Genève 1975
 Changement d’attitude des consommateurs envers le vin. IRCM, Genève 1977
 Yin-Yang mystery of the Chinese Gastronomy. HTA, Hong Kong 1985
 Taste harmony of the Thai cuisine. TAT, Bangkok 1987
 Magyar borok és ételek harmonizációja. Paginárum, Budapest 1999
 Das Hormonieren von ungarischen Weinen und Speisen. Paginárum, Budapest 2000
 Balatoni borgasztronómia. Paginárum, Budapest 2000
 A bor vallása. Szigtim, Budapest 2000
 Balaton Wine Gastronomy. Paginárum, Budapest 2000
 Tokaji borgasztronómia. Paginárum, Budapest 2001
 Tokajer Weingastronomie. Paginárum, Budapest 2001
 Harmony in Hungarian Food and Wine. Paginárum, Budapest 2001
 A magyar konyha ízei. Paginárum, Budapest 2002
 Japán konyha - Az Istenek világa. Paginárum, Budapest 2002
 A kínai konyha. Az erotika és a jin-jang filozófia titokzatos világa. Paginárum, Budapest 2002
 Hungaricum borgasztronómia. Paginárum, Budapest 2003
 A thai konyha, az ízek paradicsoma. Paginárum, Budapest 2003
 Hunok és magyarok konyhája. Mezőgazda, Budapest 2003
 Magyar halgasztronómia. Szigtim, Budapest 2003
 Magyar vadgasztronómia. Szigtim, Budapest 2003
 A szerelem gasztronómiája. Mezőgazda, Budapest 2004
 A magyar bor szellemisége. Hun-Idea, Budapest 2004
 A magyar konyha filozófiája. Püski, Budapest 2009
 Megszólalnak a jelképek. Püski, Budapest 2009

Novels 

 A Sólyom embere útjai. Paginárum, Budapest 2001
 A fehér tigris szellemének harcosa. Kairosz, Budapest 2004
 A Sólyom népe. Püski, Budapest 2010
 Atilla, a Hun üzenet. Püski, Budapest 2012
 A Pozsonyi csata. Püski, Budapest 2013
 Koppány – A Fény harcosa. Püski, Budapest 2014
 1526: a végzetes mohácsi úttévesztés – Béke vagy 150 év háború! Püski, Budapest 2015
 Végvári oroszlánok – Élni és halni a hazáért. Püski, Budapest 2016
 Atilla, the Hun message. Püski, Budapest 2017
 Nincs más út, csak a szabadság – Bocskai–Bethlen szabadságharc török szövetséggel. Püski, Budapest 2017
 A szabadságharcos – Egy élet 1956 szellemében. Üdki, Budapest 2018
 Atilla – Gelecek Nesillere Mesaj. Ostanbul, Kabalci 2018
 A Székely Hadosztály – Erdélyért! A magyar szabadságért! Püski, Budapest 2019
 Atatürk magyarjai – Visszavágás Trianonért. Püski, Budapest 2020
 Fenn az égen hun Nap ragyog – Az Ázsiai Hun Birodalom felemelkedése. Püski, Budapest 2021 
 Atilla Sólyma. Püski, Budapest 2022

Poems 

 "Adj szabadságot vagy halált!" Gerilla-líra. Hun-Idea, Budapest 2004
 Kép a fán – Szakrális szerelem a dzsungelháborúban – Gerilla-líra II. Hun-Idea, Budapest 2005

References 

1938 births
Living people
Hungarian writers
Hungarian poets
University of Geneva alumni